Brebes is a regency in the northwestern part of Central Java province in Indonesia. It covers an area of 1,769.2km2, and it had a population of 1,733,869 at the 2010 Census and 1,978,759 at the 2020 Census. Its capital is the town of Brebes in the northeast corner of the regency, immediately adjacent to the neighbouring city of Tegal.

Administrative districts
Brebes Regency comprises seventeen districts (kecamatan), tabulated below with their areas and their populations at the 2010 Census and the 2020 Census. The table also includes the locations of the district administrative centres, the number of administrative villages (rural desa and urban kelurahan) in each district, and its post code.

Cuisine

Brebes is known for its shallots (red onions) and salted duck egg (telur asin in Indonesian).  Other popular dishes include Sate Blengong and Peuyeum Ketan from Salem, one of the seventeen districts in Brebes Regency.

References

External links
  Official Site of Brebes Regency
  Official Site of Brebes Regency Government (DPRD)